State Route 163 (SR 163) is an east-west state highway in McMinn and Polk counties of East Tennessee. It connects Calhoun and Delano, along with serving as the main access road between Interstate 75 (I-75) and Calhoun.

Route description

Officially, SR 163 begins in McMinn County at an interchange with I-75 (Exit 36). East of the interchange, the route travels as Lamontville Road through rural wooded areas running parallel to the Hiwassee River, until it reaches SR 58 in Meigs County. They go south near a paper mill operated by Resolute Forest Products, formerly Bowater, before entering a business district, where SR 163 splits off and goes through downtown as Bowater Road. SR 163 then leaves both Calhoun and the Hiwassee River behind and continues east through farmland rural areas to cross into Polk County. About  later, the highway enters the unincorporated community of Delano and comes to an end at an intersection with US 411/SR 30 (SR 33).

Major intersections

References

163
Transportation in McMinn County, Tennessee
Transportation in Polk County, Tennessee